SAFRA National Service Association is an organisation that was formed as a social and recreational club for National Servicemen from the Singapore Armed Forces. It was originally formed in 1972 as the "Singapore Armed Forces Reservist Association".

History 
SAFRA was started on 2 July 1972 and was launched by, then Defence Minister of Singapore, Dr Goh Keng Swee.

From 1996 to 2012 (Sunday 17 June, Fathers Day) SAFRA and Republic of Singapore Air Force (RSAF) co-organized the National Runway Cycling & Skating at Paya Lebar Air Base with 6,000–8,000 participants. ("Skating" was included in the events name from 2008 on, when skaters grew more.)

Mission 
The SAFRA Mission

"To be a dynamic institution effective in bonding NSmen through a network of quality lifestyle clubs, services and activities. We shall be reputed for our good value and innovation."

This was to reward servicemen for their service to the nation with some relaxation from their hectic lives.

Locations 
There are currently 7 SAFRA clubhouses located across the island:

Gallery

See also 

Recreation
Work-life balance
Entertainment
R&R (military)

References

1972 establishments in Singapore
Military of Singapore